Michael Leonard is the name of:
 Michael Leonard (field hockey) (born 1974), Scottish field hockey player
 Mike Leonard (journalist) (born 1947), American television journalist
 Mick Leonard (Australian footballer) (1914–1984), Australian footballer
 Mick Leonard (English footballer) (born 1959), English footballer
 Mick Leonard (Scottish footballer) (born 1953), Scottish footballer
 Michael Leonard (cyclist) (born 2004), Canadian cyclist